The Bell Telephone Building is a neoclassical office building in Montreal, Quebec, Canada. It was constructed with a steel frame between 1927 and 1929. It once contained the head office for the Bell Telephone Company.

The Bell Telephone Building has  of class B office space. It was renovated in 1980.

References

Skyscrapers in Montreal
Office buildings completed in 1929
Neoclassical architecture in Canada
Bell Canada
Skyscraper office buildings in Canada
Downtown Montreal
Landmarks in Montreal
Headquarters in Canada
1929 establishments in Quebec

 {Montreal-stub}